Myorhinini is a weevil tribe in the subfamily Entiminae.

Genera 
Anathresa – Aneremnodes – Apsis – Bicodes – Echinocnemodes – Ephimerostylus – Epipolaionyx – Eremnodes – Eudraces – Goniorhinus – Haptomerus – Holorygma – Lecanophora – Malosomus – Nastomma – Neobicodes – Opseorhinus – Parepeigorrhinus – Pareremnodes – Parhaptomerus – Siereorrhynchus – Stereorhynchus – Subhaptomerus – Sympiezorhynchus – Umzila – Zeugorygma

References 

 Marseul, S.A. de 1863: Catalogue des Coléoptères d'Europe et du Bassin de la Méditérranée en Afrique et en Asie. Deuxième edition. Laval, Imprimerie de Mary-Beauchêne. Paris: [2] + 300 pp.
 Oberprieler, R.G. 1995: Systematic position and composition of the tribes Tanyrhynchini and Myorhinini (Coleoptera: Curculionidae). pp. 155–167 in: Anderson, R.S. & Lyal, C.H.C., Biology and phylogeny of Curculionoidea. Memoirs of the Entomological Society of Washington, (14)

External links 

Entiminae
Polyphaga tribes